Cara Black and Elena Likhovtseva were the defending champions, but Likhovtseva chose to compete at Canberra during the same week. Black teamed up with Nicole Pratt and were forced to withdraw at the quarterfinals.

Tathiana Garbin and Rita Grande won the title by defeating Catherine Barclay and Christina Wheeler 6–2, 7–6(7–3) in the final.

Seeds

Draw

Draw

References

External links
 Official results archive (ITF)
 Official results archive (WTA)

Tasmanian International
Tasmanian International
Hobart International